Afghanistan Investment Support Agency (AISA;  / ) was established in September 2003 as an agency that is charged with the responsibility to facilitate registration, licensing and promotion of all investments in Afghanistan. Its purpose is to attract industrial and developmental investment. AISA does this by providing services to investors, facilitating cross border partnerships, advocating business enabling measures and reforms, and proactively promoting Afghanistan as an attractive business and investment destination.

References

Government of Afghanistan
Government agencies established in 2003